Sue Ulu is an American voice actress and actress who, primarily, voiced in English dubs for anime properties licensed by ADV Films during the 1990s. Her most prominent roles include Ritsuko Akagi in Neon Genesis Evangelion and Kei in Dirty Pair Flash.

Filmography

Anime

Films

References

External links
 
 
 
 Sue Ulu at CrystalAcids Anime Voice Actor Database

Living people
American stage actresses
American voice actresses
Actresses from Houston
1963 births
20th-century American actresses
21st-century American actresses